Swiss Standard German, or Swiss High German ( or Schweizerhochdeutsch), referred to by the Swiss as Schriftdeutsch, or Hochdeutsch, is the written form of one of four official languages in Switzerland, besides French, Italian and Romansh. It is a variety of Standard German, used in the German-speaking part of Switzerland and Liechtenstein. It is mainly written, and rather less often spoken.

Swiss Standard German differs from Swiss German, an umbrella term for the various Alemannic German dialects (in the sense of "traditional regional varieties") that are the default everyday languages in German-speaking Switzerland.

German is a pluricentric language. In contrast with other local varieties of German, Swiss Standard German has distinctive features in all linguistic domains: not only in phonology, but also in vocabulary, syntax, morphology and orthography. These characteristics of Swiss Standard German are called Helvetisms. Besides influences from Alemannic German, those characteristics include extensive use of loan words from Romance languages, especially French.

Written Swiss Standard German

Swiss Standard German (SSG) is the official written language in German-speaking Switzerland and Liechtenstein. It is used in books, all official publications (including all laws and regulations), in newspapers, printed notices, most advertising and in other printed matter. Authors write literature mainly using Swiss Standard German; some dialect literature exists. SSG is similar in most respects to the Standard German in Germany and Austria; there are a few differences in spelling, most notably the replacing of the German ligature ß with ss (since the 20th century). For example:

There are some differences in vocabulary, including, for instance, using a loanword from another language. For example:

In addition, SSG uses different orthography in letter writing, and the salutations used for the same also differ from Standard German.

The Swiss use the Standard German word Spital (hospital). Spital is also found in volumes of Standard German language dictionaries; however, Germans from northern Germany prefer to use Krankenhaus, whereas Spital is also used in areas of southern Germany, Austria, Liechtenstein, and South Tyrol.

There are differences in gender for some nouns:

de-ch: das Tram (neuter); de: die Tram (feminine) (Straßenbahn is used more frequently in Germany); en: tram
de-ch: das E-Mail (neuter); de: die E-Mail (feminine); en: e-mail

Some expressions are borrowed from French and thus differ from usage in Germany, such as

de-ch: ich habe kalt (literally "I have cold"), de: mir ist [es] kalt (literally "[it] is cold to me")
de-ch: das geht dir gut, de: das passt dir gut (it suits you)

The Swiss keyboard layout has no  key, nor does it have the capital umlaut keys Ä, Ö and Ü. This dates back to mechanical typewriters that had the French diacritical marks letters on these keys to allow the Swiss to write French on a Swiss German QWERTZ keyboard (and vice versa). Thus a Swiss German VSM keyboard has an  key that prints an à (a-grave) when shifted. However, it is possible to write uppercase umlauts by use of caps lock or by using the  dead key.

The names of municipalities, towns, stations, and streets are often not written with a starting capital umlaut, but instead with Ae, Oe and Ue, such as the Zürich suburb Oerlikon, or the hamlet Aetzikofen, or the Bernese municipality Uebeschi. However, field names, such as Äbenegg, Ötikon (near Stäfa), or Überthal, and any other word, such as Ärzte (English: physicians), usually start with capital umlauts.

As for the various dialects of Swiss German, they are occasionally written, but their written usage is mostly restricted to informal situations such as private text messages, e-mails, letters, notes, or within social media such as Facebook. The ability of German Swiss to transliterate their language into writing is an integral and important part of the identity and culture of German-speaking Switzerland.

Spoken Swiss Standard German
The default spoken language in German-speaking Switzerland is the respective local dialect. Due to a rather large inter-cantonal migration rate (about 5% p.a.) within modern Switzerland for decades, many different Swiss German dialects are spoken in any one place, especially in urban areas; for example, in the city of Zürich (end of 2013): of the 272,700 Swiss (total: 400,000) living in Zürich, only 40% (28%) are from Zürich itself with 51% (36%) from the entire canton of Zürich.

Outside of any educational setting, Swiss Standard German is only spoken in very few specific formal situations, such as in news broadcasts and reputable programmes of the public media channels; in the parliaments of German-speaking cantons; in the federal parliament in Berne (unless another official language of Switzerland is used), although dialect is certainly encroaching on this domain; in loudspeaker announcements in public places such as railway stations, etc. Church services, including the sermon and prayers, are usually in Swiss Standard German. Generally in any educational setting Swiss Standard German is used (during lessons, lectures or tutorials). However, outside of lessons Swiss-German dialects are used, even when, for example, talking to a teacher about the class. The situations in which Swiss Standard German is spoken are characteristically formal and public, and there are situations where written communication is also important.

In informal situations, Swiss Standard German is only used whenever a German Swiss is communicating with a non-Swiss and it is assumed that this person does not understand the respective dialect. Amongst themselves, the German-speaking Swiss use their respective Swiss German dialect, irrespective of social class, education or topic.

Unlike other regions where German varieties are spoken, there is no continuum between Swiss Standard German and the Swiss German dialects. The speakers speak either Swiss Standard German, or a Swiss German dialect, and they are conscious about this choice.

Diglossia
The concurrent usage of Swiss Standard German and Swiss German dialects has been called a typical case of diglossia, although this term is often reserved to language pairs where the vernacular has lower prestige than the other, while Swiss German dialects do not meet this criterion as they permeate every socio-economic class of society. Since Swiss Standard German is the usual written language and the Swiss German dialects are the usual spoken language, their interrelation has sometimes been called a medial diglossia instead.

Attitude to spoken Swiss Standard German
Most German Swiss can speak fluent Swiss Standard German, but may or may not like doing so, as it feels stilted and unnatural to many. When they compare their Swiss Standard German to the way people from Germany speak, they think their own proficiency is inferior because it is studied and slower. Most German Swiss think that the majority speak rather poor Swiss Standard German; however, when asked about their personal proficiency, a majority will answer that they speak quite well.

Notes

References

Literature

Languages of Switzerland
National varieties of German
German, Swiss
Diglossia